Rugby Aid is a rugby union organisation that is supported by World Rugby, formally known as the International Rugby Board (IRB), to aid in global charities of different causes. In 2005, the first match took place to raise money for the United Nations World Food Programme to support its work aiding victims of the 2004 Indian Ocean tsunami. While in 2011, saw a repeat of the fixture in aid of Help for Heroes, and in 2015, an England vs Rest of the World XV match took place in aid of the same charity. In 2015, confectionery brand Mentos was unveiled as an official sponsor of the event.

Results

2005

Notes:
 Northern Hemisphere player Chris Horsman was not internationally capped.
 Southern Hemisphere players Matt Mustchin and Shane Drahm were not internationally capped.

2011

See also
Football for Hope
World Cricket Tsunami Appeal

References

External links
 Rugbyaid.irb.com
 IRB North v South Rugby Aid Match raises US$3.35 million at rugbyaid.irb.com
 SA Stars for IRB Rugby Tsunami Aid Match
 Zurich Premiership Club Release 15 For IRB Rugby Aid Match

2004 Indian Ocean earthquake and tsunami
Rugby Aid Match
World Rugby